Sayidomar Aden Guled is a Somali politician. He is the State Minister of Health of the Puntland State of Somalia, and was sworn in on 17 February 2016.

References 

Living people
Political office-holders in Somalia
Puntland politicians
Health ministers of Somalia
Year of birth missing (living people)